is an open-air complex of sites in Minami-ku, Sapporo, dedicated to visual and performing art exhibits and facilities.  Constructed in 1986, the park was established "to cultivate unique new culture in Sapporo and create an environment in which the city, the arts, and culture exist in harmony with Sapporo’s natural beauty." The park is situated in the forests on the outskirts of Sapporo, close to Sapporo City University.  In addition to art and sculpture displays, the park also rents out workshops, studios, and other spaces for creative arts.

Facilities

Sapporo Art Museum

The Sapporo Art Museum contains changing exhibits from artists connected with Sapporo and Hokkaido, as well as other Japanese and international artists.

Sapporo Sculpture Garden

The sculpture garden is set in an expansive hilly circuit containing 74 sculptures by 64 artists. It is closed during the winter season, when a snowshoeing trail operates instead.

Satō Chūryō Children's Atelier

The works of Churyo Sato, a sculptor born in Miyagi Prefecture and educated in Hokkaido, are displayed in this atelier, which also hosts workshops for children to learn sculpting.

Takeo Arishima Residence

The residence of Takeo Arishima, a famous novelist of the late Meiji (era) and early Taishō eras, was moved to the park.  Arishima was educated at Sapporo Agricultural College, now Hokkaido University, and spent many years in Sapporo, where his father owned a tenant farm.  The residence contains exhibits and information about Arishima and his life.  A cafe is also on the premises.

Outdoor Stage

An outdoor stage hosts live performances of classical, jazz, and other varieties of music during the summer season. It has been the site of the Sapporo Jazz Festival, among others.

References

External links
  Sapporo Art Park
  札幌芸術の森

Museums in Sapporo
History of Hokkaido
Tourist attractions in Sapporo